Rasputin – Miracles Lie in the Eye of the Beholder is a rock opera about the mysterious and infamous Russian peasant, Grigori Rasputin. Written by Michael Rapp, musician and author of several musicals and film scores, Rasputin is a triple CD concept album featuring Ted Neeley (of Jesus Christ Superstar fame) as Rasputin, British actor John Hurt as the Narrator, and Amanda McBroom as Tsarina Alexandra. On December 18, 1999, a single night showcase of Rasputin was performed at the Grand Opera House in Wilmington, Delaware featuring:
Ted Neeley as the Mad Monk Rasputin
James O'Neil as Tsar Nicholas II
M. Ross Ramone as Alexei
Caitlin Custer as Anastasia
Larry Friedman as Derevenko
Christopher P. Carey as Doctor Botkin

Rasputin is one of many projects in line for a full production in the coming future, pending cast availability.

Concept Album Cast

Rasputin — Ted Neeley
Narrator — John Hurt
Tsarina Alexandra — Amanda McBroom
Prince Yusupov — Bradley Dean
Tsar Nicholas II — James O' Neil
Alexei — Ross Ramone
Gypsy — Dianna Collins Jennings
Olga Nikolaevna — Sarah Gliko
Tatiana Nikolaevna — Katie Walsh
Maria Nikolaevna — Tracy Stephens
Anastasia — Krissy Doyle
Doctor Botkin — Christopher Carey
Rebel — Anthony Dibenedetto
Mysterious Lady/Peasant Girl — Christine Rea
Derevenko — Larry Friedman

Concept Album Track Listing 

Act I — Gold Disc

Act II – Green Disc

Act III — Purple Disc

External links
http://www.rasputinthemusical.com

Rock operas
2000 albums
Operas based on real people
Operas set in Russia
Cultural depictions of Grigori Rasputin
Cultural depictions of Nicholas II of Russia